Henry Arnold Favell (1845–1896) was an Anglican priest in the 19th century.
 
Born in Sheffield, he was baptised 3 January 1845 and educated at Sheffield Collegiate School and Gonville and Caius College, Cambridge. Ordained in 1867, he spent 6 years as a Curate in Birmingham before becoming Vicar of St George's, Sheffield. 10 years later, he became the incumbent at St Mark's in the same city. He became Archdeacon of Sheffield in 1895 but died a year later.

References
	

1845 births
People educated at Sheffield Collegiate School
Alumni of Gonville and Caius College, Cambridge
19th-century English Anglican priests
Archdeacons of Sheffield
1896 deaths